Caradog "Crag" Jones or Caradoc Jones (born 1962) is a Welsh mountaineer.  

On 23 May 1995, Jones became the first Welshman to reach the summit of Mount Everest (and the 724th overall).

Jones has climbed all over the world, and has made a diverse range of first ascents including with Mick Fowler on Hunza Peak in Pakistan (1991), with Fowler again with Yes, Please (E3 6a) on  Yesnaby Castle sea-stack in Orkney (1996), and a solo climb of the highest peak of Three Brothers, South Georgia (2001). Jones has also undertaken exploratory expeditions, such as in 2005 with Julian Freeman-Attwood, Rich Howarth, and Skip Novak, when they completed a 17-day south–north traverse of South Georgia, which also included a first ascent of Peak 5680.

Jones was born and raised in Pontrhydfendigaid, a village near Tregaron, Ceredigion, in Wales. In 1982, he graduated with a degree in marine biology at Bangor University, and in-between climbing expeditions, Jones has worked in fisheries including in the Falklands and in South Georgia.  He now lives with his wife and children in Frodsham, Cheshire, working as a freelance fisheries consultant.

See also 
 Timeline of climbing Mount Everest
List of 20th-century summiters of Mount Everest

References

External links 
 1995 Britsh Everest Expedition
 Everest: Wales on top of world, BBC News (29 May 2003)

1962 births
Living people
Alumni of Bangor University
Welsh explorers
Welsh mountain climbers
People from Ceredigion
People from Frodsham
British summiters of Mount Everest
Sportspeople from Cheshire